Fast of the Firstborn (Ta'anit B'khorot or , Ta'anit B'khorim) is a unique fast day in Judaism which usually falls on the day before Passover (i.e., the fourteenth day of Nisan, a month in the Jewish calendar; Passover begins on the fifteenth of Nisan). In modern times, the fast is usually broken at a siyum celebration (typically made at the conclusion of the morning services), which, according to prevailing custom, creates an atmosphere of rejoicing that overrides the requirement to continue the fast (see Breaking the fast below). Unlike all other Jewish fast days, only firstborn children are required to fast on the Fast of the Firstborn.

This fast commemorates the salvation of the Israelite firstborns during the Plague of the Firstborn (according to the Book of Exodus, the tenth of the ten plagues wrought upon Ancient Egypt prior to the Exodus of the Children of Israel), when, according to Exodus (12:29): "...God struck every firstborn in the Land of Mitzrayim (Ancient Egypt)...."

Origins
The primary source quoted for this custom is Tractate Soferim 21:3, where it is stated that firstborns fast "in commemoration of the miracle that they were saved from the Plague of the Firstborn." Rabbeinu Asher and Rabbeinu Aharon HaKohein quote the Jerusalem Talmud as an additional source for the fast, though the same passage can also be understood to mean that firstborns do not fast.

The Shulchan Aruch records the custom of fasting, however R' Moshe Isserles records that some people instead "redeem" the fast. Later commentaries suggest that this redemption could be done by holding a siyum or by giving charity. R' Yosef Eliyahu Henkin suggests that since the custom is absent from the (Babylonian) Talmud, it is not universally binding but rather depends on current practice, allowing the current practice of replacing the fast with a siyum or charity (Henkin preferred charity).

Meaning of the fast
Fasts in Judaism can have a number of purposes, including atonement for sins; commemorative mourning, and commemorative gratitude (see Ta'anit). 

The Fast of the Firstborn incorporates commemorative gratitude for salvation from the Plague of the Firstborn, as detailed above.

According to Rabbi Jacob Emden, the Fast of the Firstborn also commemorates the salvation of the Jews from the plot of Haman. This is because Haman advanced his plot on the thirteenth of Nisan, and Queen Esther reacted by instructing all Jews of Shushan to undertake a three-day fast beginning the next day, the fourteenth of Nisan. For this reason, even some non-firstborns maintain the custom to fast on the fourteenth of Nisan.

According to Rabbi Shlomo Zalman Auerbach, the Fast of the Firstborn also includes an aspect of mourning: firstborns fast to mourn the loss of their priestly status which had initially been granted them on the fourteenth of Nisan. Furthermore, during the Temple period, this loss was most profoundly felt on the fourteenth of Nisan, which was the busiest day of the year for the Temple priests and Levites.

Rabbi Yehuda Grunwald (Rabbi of Satmar and student of the Ketav Sofer) suggests that the firstborn Israelites fasted in trepidation in advance of the Plague of the Firstborn; despite a divine guarantee of safety, they felt a need to fast in repentance to achieve greater divine protection. Rabbi Grunwald thus posits that this was the precedent for the Fast of the Firstborn.

Qualifications for fasting
There is disagreement among the early halakhic authorities (authoritative scholars of Jewish law) as to who qualifies as a firstborn (bechor) for purposes of the Fast of the Firstborn. All authorities agree, however, to the conditions of halakhic adulthood (generally speaking, this is 12 years for a female and 13 years for a male) and sanity, preconditions for all positive mitzvot, to obligate one to fast. (Other rare conditions, such as deaf-muteness, also exempt one from positive mitzvot).

According to the Bayit Chadash, the Sefer Agudah, and arguably the Maharil, both men and women are obligated to fast. This is based upon the Midrash, which states that both men and women among the firstborn Egyptians perished in the plague. Following a precedent common in Jewish commemorative rituals, the above authorities ruled that all those who were miraculously saved should participate in commemoration (see also Pesachim 108b). Since both men and women died from the plague, all firstborn Jewish men and women alive at that time are considered to have been miraculously saved. The Rema and the Vilna Gaon rule that women are exempt from the fast. As the Book of Exodus (13:12–15) mentions the biblical commandment of Redemption of the Firstborn as commemorative of the salvation of Jewish firstborns in Egypt, and as this command only applies to firstborn males, the Rema and the Vilna Gaon rule similarly that only males are obligated to fast. Common practice is that only males fast.

While a firstborn to both parents, or a firstborn to only the mother, must fast according to all authorities, there is a dispute among the early halakhic authorities regarding the status of a firstborn to only the father. The Shulchan Aruch codifies that a firstborn to only the father is obligated to fast, while most printings of the Arba'ah Turim indicate that such a person would be exempt. Common practice follows the Shulchan Aruch.

Typically, if the oldest in the family died, the next oldest is not required to fast. However, if the oldest child had died within 30 days of birth, the next oldest is required to fast. (The Dagul Mervavah maintains that this only applies if the oldest child had been born prematurely or was not born viable).

Many authorities, including the Rema, note the custom that the father of a firstborn should fast on his child's behalf until the child reaches halakhic adulthood. The Rema rules that if the father is a firstborn himself, the mother should fast on behalf of the child. The Mateh Moshe and Maharil dispute this and rule in such a scenario that the mother need not fast. The Magen Avraham rules that it is appropriate to follow the lenient opinion if fasting causes the mother excessive discomfort or if she is pregnant or nursing, but he adds that a mother who begins following the former opinion must maintain that custom and fast in subsequent years.

The Sh'vut Ya'akov (1:17) rules that the above-cited custom of the father fasting for the child goes into effect as soon as the child is born, except where the child is born after chatzot ha'laila (halakhic midnight, which generally corresponds to solar midnight) on the 14th of Nisan of that year. (Since the child had not yet been born by the equivalent time that the Plague of the Firstborn had occurred in Egypt, the father need not fast for his child until the following year) The Korban N'tan'el disagrees. He writes that the custom only goes into effect from the time the child is 30 days old. This relates, again, to the command to redeem the firstborn, which does not go into effect until the child is 30 days old.

There is some discussion among the poskim (halakhic authorities) regarding whether a firstborn born through Caesarean section is required to observe this fast, given that he is not obligated in the Redemption of the Firstborn. The Chok Ya'akov (470:2) suggests that such a firstborn may be required to fast, while the Kaf HaChayyim (470:3) rules that he need not fast. To circumvent this question, as well as dispute regarding a firstborn non-Jew who converts to Judaism, Rabbi Yosef Shalom Elyashiv suggests that such firstborns participate in a seudat mitzvah (see here and here below).

Duration of the fast
As with most Jewish fast days, the fast begins at dawn. The common practice is that it is subsequently broken in the morning at a seudat mitzvah (celebratory meal) following a siyum. If the fast is not broken at a seudat mitzvah, there is a dispute among halakhic authorities regarding the duration of the fast. Normally, all Jewish fasts continue until nightfall (most authorities rule that this is approximately 40 minutes after sunset, but varies by location and time of year). However, the presence of a fast immediately before a holiday presents a unique quandary. Normally, one may not enter a Shabbat (Saturday, the Jewish Sabbath) or Yom Tov (festival) in a state of fasting. The Talmud (Eruvin 41a) discusses what one should do when a formal fast day (other than Yom Kippur) falls directly before Shabbat or Yom Tov. The sages of the Talmud are divided over two options: Either one should break the fast shortly before sundown, or one should fast through nightfall, regardless. Since the Talmud arrives at no clear conclusion, disagreement arose among halakhic authorities. The Maharil rules that the fast continues until nightfall, while others rule that it should be broken before sundown.

Breaking the fast
In modern times, however, this fast is rarely observed, as most firstborns opt to attend a siyum (festive meal celebrating the completion of a tractate of the Talmud) instead. This is considered a legitimate form of "breaking" the fast, and therefore the firstborn may eat during the rest of the day.

The Mishnah Berurah quotes three opinions regarding circumstances in which the fast may be broken. According to the first, a healthy individual must fast if he can sustain the fast without undue suffering and without any subsequent weakening that would affect his ability or inclination to heartily partake of his Passover Seder meal (and specifically the matzah). (If one is obligated to partake of a festive meal that day, such as if he is the father of an infant on the day of circumcision, this opinion requires him to undertake a reciprocal fast at the soonest opportunity.) According to the second custom (quoted by the Magen Avraham in the name of the Maharash Levi), the fast may be broken at any festive meal celebrating a circumcision or a redemption of the firstborn. According to the third custom, based upon the Maharshal, the fast may even be broken at a seudat mitzvah for a siyum celebrating the completion of study of a tractate of Talmud. The latter custom is commonly observed.

If a firstborn attending a siyum does not hear the completion of the tractate, or if he does not understand what he hears, or if he is in the shiva period of mourning and is thus forbidden from listening to the Torah material being taught, some authorities rule that subsequent eating would not qualify as a seudat mitzvah and he would therefore be forbidden to break his fast. Other authorities allow a firstborn to break his fast under such circumstances. The Minchas Yitzchak (ibid.) suggests that a firstborn in such a position should at least try to contribute to the siyum in some way, such as by sponsoring or helping to prepare the meal.

In order to break one's fast on a seudat mitzvah, many authorities rule that one must partake of at least a kotevet of food (around 1.5 to 2 oz.) or a melo lugmav of liquid (at least around 1.7 oz.) at the seudah. Other authorities rule that a firstborn need not eat anything at the siyum itself, and that he may break his fast anytime after the siyum.

Rabbi Moshe Feinstein extends the possibility of breaking the fast to include even breaking it at a festive meal celebrating the completion of any mitzvah that required regular, continual involvement. According to these authorities, such a meal would be considered a seudat mitzvah of adequate caliber to exempt one from continuing the fast.

Additionally, the Mordechai quotes the ruling of his father-in-law Rabbeinu Yechiel that firstborns need not fast at all on the day before Passover; firstborns need only limit their diet to snacks. (The Bigdei Yesha commentary suggests the rationale behind this ruling was to avoid holding a fast during the month of Nisan, which is generally prohibited.) The Mishnah Berurah states that it is appropriate for a weak individual to follow this ruling.

Nevertheless, there are communities, including many North African communities and the Sephardic community in Amsterdam, where the firstborns do fast.

When Passover begins after Shabbat
If the day before Passover falls on Shabbat, many authorities rule that the fast is not observed at all, and others set for the previous Thursday (this is the common practice today). This is because it is forbidden to fast on Shabbat (except for where Yom Kippur falls on Shabbat), and fasts are preferably not set for Friday. In such a scenario, the ritual of Bedikat Chametz (the formal search for forbidden leaven that is conducted before Passover) is set for Thursday night. Normally, it is forbidden to eat (starting from nightfall) before conducting the Bedikat Chametz. However, for a firstborn who is fatigued or uncomfortable from the fast, the Mateh Moshe and Maharil rule that some food may be eaten before the search or that another person may be appointed to perform the search on behalf of the firstborn.

Rabbi Moshe Feinstein (OC 4:69:4) raises the possibility, based on the Rema that one who breaks the adjusted Thursday fast might be required to fast on Friday, as perhaps the fast is considered to have been moved to whichever earlier day is more appropriate, and not to Thursday specifically. Since there are many opinions that dispute the Rema, Rabbi Feinstein writes that, practically speaking, one should not fast on Friday in such circumstances. This rationale may be based on the above cited Korban N'tan'el, who writes that excessive strictures regarding keeping the Fast of the Firstborn should not come at the expense of possibly fasting unnecessarily during the month of Nisan.

The above halakhic quandary is avoided completely if a firstborn fasts the entire day on Thursday. However, Rabbi Feinstein makes no mention of this requirement. In order for a firstborn (who eats on Thursday) to comply with the ruling of the Rema, the Piskei T'shuvot suggests participating in a second siyum on Friday, while Rabbi Tzvi Pesach Frank suggests partaking on Friday of leftovers from the previous day's siyum.

Status of the fast

In halakha, there are two general types of fast: the communal fast and the individuals' fast. Among other differences between the two, a special prayer is added by the Chazzan (leader of the prayers) on communal fasts whenever both ten fasting individuals congregate and the Chazzan is fasting. While the Magen Avraham treats the fast as an individuals' fast, the Shiyurei K'nesset Ha-G'dolah, the P'ri Chadash, and the Or Zaru'a view it as a communal fast. To avoid the practical implications of the controversy, the Mishnah Berurah suggests that a firstborn should not serve as Chazzan on the day of the fast.

Additionally, this fast differs from many other fasts established in the Jewish calendar in that this fast is not indicated in the Hebrew Scriptures. This lessens the severity of the fast, and someone who experiences significant discomfort as a result of fasting may break his fast (Mishnah Berurah based on the Rema).

Modern practice

The custom of the Fast of the Firstborn is today observed nearly universally throughout Orthodox Ashkenazic communities. However some Sefardic and Mizrahi communities have not fully adopted the custom. It is not traditionally observed by Yemenite Jews and its practice was discouraged by Moroccan-Israeli rabbi Joseph Messas.

Amongst Conservative Jews, the custom is endorsed by various communities and cited positively in their responsa.

Rabbi Jacob Petuchowski at Hebrew Union College/Jewish Institute of Religion, Cincinnati, Reform, taught that Tsom B'chorot was the clearest example of a fast with a moral, social action message. Concern for life, even lives of enemies and oppressors, is the reason for the fast.

See also
 Jewish holiday
 Passover
 Quartodecimanism

Notes and references

Further reading
 The Book of Our Heritage Eliyahu Kitov, Feldheim Inc., 1968
 The Festivals in Halacha Shlomo Yosef Zevin, Mesorah Publications, 1981
 Halachas of Tanit Bechorim

External links
 Laws and customs of the Fast of the Firstborn
 Audio lecture on Fast of the Firstborn by Rabbi Michael Taubes
 Elaboration on the meaning and laws of the fast by Rabbi Daniel Travis
 Firstborn caesarian section births, firstborn converts, and the required degree of participation in a siyum
 Fast of the Firstborn when Erev Pesach falls on Shabbat
 Women and the Fast of the Firstborn 
 Rabbi Dr. Raymond Apple on Fast of the First-Born
 My Jewish Learning article on the Fast of the Firstborn
 Rabbi Eliezer Melamed, Peninei Halakha Laws Of Pesach, Page 217-223, Ta’anit Bekhorot – the Fast of the Firstborns, Who Is Included in the Custom to Fast?, The Custom to Rely on a Siyum Masekhet

Passover
Jewish fast days
Jewish law
Nisan observances